Tribal Rain is a Nepali acoustic experimental band from Sikkim, India. The band released their first album—Roka Yo Samay in 2017. Bhanai, Chinta and Narisawna are some of their popular songs.

Formation and debut album 
The band was formed in 2013 by Rahul Rai, Kenneth Adhikari, Prawes Lama and Sushant Ghatani. Rai was the lead vocalist and guitarist. Lama, Ghatani and Adhikari played guitar, cajon and keyboard respectively.

They initially released a single titled—Chinta, which was followed by two other singles Bhanai and Narisawna. They then released an album titled—Roka Yo Samay in 2017, consisting of 11 tracks.

Death of Rahul Rai 
The music video of Bhanai was released on 13 February 2018. A day before on 14 February 2018, the lead vocalist Rahul Rai was found dead in an apparent suicide. A documentary on the life of Rahul Rai was released on 14  April 2022.

Discography 
Roka Yo Samay (2017)

References 

Indian musical groups
Sikkim
Nepalese musical groups